Malathy (or Malathi) Lakshman (born 27 August 1973) is a female Indian Telugu/Tamil language playback singer.<ref>{{cite web | url=https://www.vikatan.com/news/celebrity/singer-malathy-lakshman-shares-about-her-inspirational-words | title=நடுராத்திரி, நடு ரோட்டில், தனியா காரைத் துரத்திட்டு ஓடினேன்..!" - பாடகி மாலதி லக்ஷ்மன் | publisher=vikatan.com | date=20 January 2020 | access-date=15 August 2020 }}</ref> She is known for singing the song "Aa Ante Amalapuram"  from Arya''.

Notable filmography

References

1973 births
Living people
Women musicians from Tamil Nadu
Indian women playback singers
21st-century Indian singers
Singers from Tamil Nadu
21st-century Indian women singers